The third season of Vietnam Idol premiered on VTV6 on August 21, 2010. There are two episodes every Tuesday and Saturday together with a daily five-minute news. This season features a new option for the judges is to "save" a contestant from elimination. This, however, was not used this season.

Trần Nguyễn Uyên Linh was announced to be the third winner of Vietnam Idol, she received $20,000 in cash and a recording contract.

Process
Following a break in production, it was confirmed that the show has been renewed for 2010. The new season will adopt a new structure, with changes to broadcasting and production. The broadcasting stations were changed from HTV (Ho Chi Minh City Television) to VTV6 - a cable channel targeted at young audiences of VTV (Vietnam Television)  The producer company of the first 2 seasons, Dong Tay Promotion, will be replaced by BHD Pictures.  Siu Black remains on the judging panel but will be joined by two new judges, Quốc Trung and Nguyễn Quang Dũng. Phan Anh will also take over as the host of the contest.

Audition round

Auditions were also held in Central Highlands and North regions.

One hundred contestants will advance from this round and into the Knock Out Round.

HCMC week
The first day of the week featured ninety-six contestants (but actually ninety-three were present at that time) advanced from the audition round. After the first elimination, forty-eight remained and then split up into 12 groups of four. Twenty-four made it into the final round in which judges revealed who were the semi-finalists.

Semi-finals
The semi-finals takes place over three weeks, with the results announced the following Tuesday. During the first two weeks, sixteen contestants are split and perform by gender. Only four of them will be given a bye to the Top 10, while the remaining 10 contestants compete in the last semi-final round for a spot in the finals. During this whole process, judges have the right to let their five favorite contestants be finalists.

Top 16

Wildcard

Finals
The finals began two weeks after the semi-finals had concluded. Journalist Đặng Diễm Quỳnh is added to the judging panel at the start of the finals.

Each week the finalist perform live on stage to a television audience. The contestant receiving the least viewers' votes are eliminated from the competition. Introduced for the first time this season is the ability of the judges to collectively override the voters' decision once, if they deem that a contestant has been voted-out prematurely. Should this option is activated, two contests would be eliminated the following week instead of one.

Top 10 – Random choices
Mentor: Phương Vy

Top 9 – Pop/Rock
Mentor: Phương Thanh

Top 8 – R&B/Hip-hop/Dance
Mentor: Hồ Ngọc Hà

Top 7 – International music
Mentor: Thanh Bùi

Top 6 – Unforgettable songs
Mentor: Cẩm Vân

Top 5 – Diva night
Mentor: Mỹ Linh

Top 4 – Duets
Mentor: Thanh Lam
Result: Lân Nhã was eliminated

Top 3 – Judges' choice
Mentor: Siu Black

Finale – Contestant's choice, International music & Winner's single
Mentor: Hồng Nhung and Mỹ Linh

Grand Finale
The grand finale took place in Lan Anh Music Center. 2500 tickets out of over 3000 are invitational; therefore, some tickets left were scalped up to 500,000 to 700,000 VND each. The show started at 9 pm (local time) and were broadcast live on VTV3, VTV6, VTV9, YanTV and several local TV stations. Hồng Nhung and Mỹ Linh, previously mentors on the show, performed with the two finalists – Mai Hương and Uyên Linh. The show's judge Siu Black performed together with Nguyễn Thị Phương Anh. Phan Anh announced the winner of the season was Trần Nguyễn Uyên Linh from Ho Chi Minh city. Linh then performed the winning song Cảm ơn tình yêu.

Musical Performances
"Bèo dạt mây trôi" – AnB Group
"Giấc mơ Chapi" – Du Mục band
"Những nụ hôn rực rỡ" – Male Finalists
"Cô gái tự tin" – Female Finalists
"Hoa nắng" – Top 10 (excluding Mai Hương and Uyên Linh)
"Đừng ngồi trong bóng đêm" – Mai Hương
"Giấc mơ nào với tôi" – Uyên Linh
"Dại khờ" – Đức Anh and Đăng Khoa
"Phút giây ngọt ngào" – Lân Nhã and Lều Phương Anh
"Ly cafe ban mê" – Lân Nhã
"Căn gác trống" – Trung Quân
"Khao khát môi hồng" – Nguyễn Thị Phương Anh and Siu Black
"Đêm tình nhân" – Vương Linh and Bích Phương
"Một ngày mới" – Mai Hương and Hồng Nhung
"I Believe I Can Fly" – Uyên Linh and Mỹ Linh
"Anh mãi là" – Uyên Linh and Mai Hương
"Cảm ơn tình yêu" – Uyên Linh (later joined by the rest of top 10)

Elimination chart

1 The official results had Uyên Linh eliminated from the show. However, Đăng Khoa, who was safe in this round, announced that he preferred to withdraw from the competition in her stead. This followed controversy from a released surreptitious recording of a conversation involving eliminated finalist Đức Anh insulting fellow eliminated contestants, judges, the media, and others. The fifteen-minute audio was first released onto the internet forums, and subsequently released onto websites like YouTube. Đăng Khoa has admitted to being the one who did the recording but has denied being the one who released the audio. On behalf of the Executive Producers and Judges of Vietnam Idol, Diễm Quỳnh accepted Khoa's request to withdraw; therefore, Uyên Linh was saved from elimination at the last moment and did not have to perform her exit song.

Album

Compilation album

This was the first season to produce a compilation album. All the tracks from the album were recorded in studio after the season ends.

Result show performances

Cảm ơn tình yêu Live Show 
Cảm ơn tình yêu Live Show was a concert featuring all of the season 3 finalists, except for Lều Phương Anh with personal reasons. The show was produced by Huy Tuấn, who was also the musical director of Vietnam Idol this season, and was sponsored by MobiFone. The concert was held in Hanoi on January 23, 2011.

Performers

Setlist 
 Lân Nhã, Trung Quân, Phương Anh, Bích Phương, Vương Linh, Đức Anh and Đăng Khoa — - "Những nụ hôn rụ rỡ" (from the same name movie) and "Hoa nắng"
 Đức Anh — - "Bất chợt một tình yêu" (Nguyễn Đức Cường)
 Đăng Khoa — - "Dòng thời gian" (Nguyễn Hải Phong)
 Vương Linh & Bích Phương — - "Đêm tình nhân" (Phương Uyên & Lê Minh)
 Lân Nhã — - "Bóng mưa" (Hà Anh Tuấn)
 Lân Nhã & Phương Anh — - "Khúc giao mùa" (Mỹ Linh)
 Trung Quân featuring Thái Sơn (Top 24) — - "Bèo dạt mây trôi"
 Trung Quân — - "Căn gác trống" (Ưng Hoàng Phúc)
 Trung Quân & Mai Hương — - "Hồ Gươm sáng sớm" (Hoàng Hải)
 Mai Hương — - "Đừng ngồi yên trong bóng đêm" (from Giải cứu thần chết) and "Cánh buồm phiêu du" (Hồ Quỳnh Hương)
 Uyên Linh — - "Giận anh" (Phương Vy), "Take Me to the River" (Al Green), "Chỉ là giấc mơ" (Thanh Lam),
 Uyên Linh & Mai Hương — - "Anh mãi là" (Lưu Hương Giang)
 Uyên Linh & other performers — - "Cảm ơn tình yêu" (winning song)

References

External links
Vietnam Idol Official site

Vietnam Idol
2010s Vietnamese television series
2010 Vietnamese television seasons